The Syrian occupation of Lebanon began in 1976, during the Lebanese Civil War, and ended on 30 April 2005 after the Cedar Revolution and several demonstrations in which most of the Lebanese people participated, and the withdrawal agreement was signed by President Bashar al-Assad and Saad Hariri, son of Rafic Hariri. All of these changes were a result from the assassination of former Lebanese Prime Minister Rafic Hariri.

In January 1976, a Syrian proposal to restore the limits to the Palestinian guerrilla presence in Lebanon, which had been in place prior to the outbreak of the civil war, was welcomed by Maronites, but rejected by the Palestinian guerrillas. In October 1976, at a meeting of the Arab League, Syria accepted a ceasefire. The League ministers decided to expand an existing small Arab peacekeeping force in Lebanon, but it grew to be a large Arab Deterrent Force consisting almost entirely of Syrian troops. The Syrian military intervention was thus legitimized and received subsidies from the Arab League for its activities. Throughout the years of occupation, Assad regime advocated the irredentist notion of "Greater Syria" ("al-Suriyya al-Kubra"), implementing various steps to integrate Lebanon into the Syrian fold.

In 1989, at the final accords of the civil war, two rival administrations were formed in Lebanon: a military one under Michel Aoun in East Beirut and a civilian one under Selim el-Hoss based in West Beirut; the latter gained the support of the Syrians. Aoun opposed the Syrian presence in Lebanon, citing the 1982 UN Security Council Resolution 520. In the resulting "War of Liberation", which erupted in March 1989, Aoun's forces were defeated and he himself exiled from Lebanon. In 1991, a Treaty of "Brotherhood, Cooperation, and Coordination", signed between Lebanon and Syria, legitimized the Syrian military presence in Lebanon. It stipulated that Lebanon would not be made a threat to Syria's security and that Syria was responsible for protecting Lebanon from external threats. In September that same year, a Defense and Security Pact was enacted between the two countries.

With the consequent adoption of UN Security Council Resolution 1559 and following the assassination of the Lebanese ex-premier Rafic Hariri in 2005, and the alleged involvement of Syria in his death, a public uprising called the Cedar Revolution had swept the country. Syria completed its full withdrawal from Lebanon on 30 April 2005.

Background
The Lebanese Civil War that began on 13 April 1975, was the backdrop against which the Syrian military presence in Lebanon was established.

The Middle East's geopolitical landscape was reshaped by the conflicts and wars of June 1967 and October 1973. Israel's resounding win in 1967, compounded by its annexation of the Sinai Peninsula, East Jerusalem and the West Bank, the Gaza Strip, and the Golan Heights, dealt a catastrophic blow to Egyptian President Gamal Abdel Nasser and the pan-Arabist ideology. The 1973 War was accompanied by superpower tensions and direct American involvement in the conflict resolution.

Since the start of the conflict between the Arab states and the State of Israel, Lebanon found itself squeezed between Israel and Syria, Lebanon's combative larger neighbours. Lebanon itself is touched by the different confessional adherences and by regional and global politics.

Lebanon entered a brutal and protracted civil war in 1975. Disputes erupted between mostly Christian Lebanese militias (known as the Lebanese Right) and Palestinian militias, as well as predominantly non-Christian Lebanese militias (commonly referred to as the Lebanese Left).

In January 1976, its proposal to restore the limits to the Palestinian guerrilla presence in Lebanon, that had been in place prior to the outbreak of the civil war, was welcomed by Maronites and conservative Muslims, but rejected by the Palestinian guerrillas and their Lebanese Druze-led and leftist allies. Syria's interventions came in response to appeals from Maronite leaders, who were under attack by leftists and Palestinians. In a 1976 diplomatic cable released by WikiLeaks, a US diplomat stated "if I got nothing else from my meeting with Frangie, Chamoun and Gemayel, it is their clear, unequivocal and unmistakable belief that their principal hope for saving Christian necks is Syria. They sound like Assad is the latest incarnation of the Crusaders". However, after a confrontation with Lebanese Forces Leader, Bachir Gemayel, the relationship between the Syrian forces and the Maronite leaderships deteriorated. In 1977, tensions turned into hostility, and turned into an open all-out conflict between the two parties.

Simultaneously, Syria was concerned about the weak military of Lebanon as it would be a danger for Syria in their fight with Israel. Recognizing that themself also were vulnerable to an attack, Syria moved from mediation to indirect intervention in supporting guerrilla groups to, finally, the deployment of Syrian troops in Lebanon.

Syrian invasion of Lebanon 
On 31 May 1976, the Syrian army began an invasion of Lebanon. Two thousand troops and 60 tanks marched in three columns during a three-pronged offensive. The first column marched south across Shuf towards Sidon, where it was halted by PLO forces. The second column moved west along the Beirut - Damascus axis, before being stopped at Beirut. Another column moved north through the Bekaa valley, before then going west towards Tripoli, where it was stopped by Christian forces. The offensive had been halted by 10 June. In his public address in the 20th July, Hafez al-Assad re-iterated the notion of a "Greater Syria", stating: "Syria and Lebanon were one state and one people... and have shared interests and a common history"

A second Syrian offensive in mid-October 1976 succeeded at capturing all of central Lebanon as well as some of the country's most important urban centres. The hostility between Syria and Israel made Lebanon the 'perfect' playground as it is strategically located as a buffer between the south of Israel and Eastern Syria. Given Syria's proximity and historical ties with Lebanon as part of what was known as "Greater Syria", Syria has always been interested in domestic Lebanese politics.

Syrian involvement in the fighting between various Lebanese militias that erupted around the first of the year had previously been limited to tactical actions carried out by portions of the Palestine Liberation Army under Damascus' supervision. Around 4 April, these efforts were bolstered by a virtual blockade of Lebanon's ports by Syrian navy forces, ostensibly to prevent the fighting factions from receiving resupply of arms and ammunition. Syrian armed forces regular infantry and armored units arrived into Lebanese territory with force less than a week later.

Occupation period

By October 1976, Syria had caused significant damage to the strength of the leftists and their Palestinian allies, but at a meeting of the Arab League, it was forced to accept a ceasefire. The League ministers decided to expand an existing small Arab peacekeeping force in Lebanon. It grew to be a large deterrent force consisting almost entirely of Syrian troops. The Syrian military intervention was thus legitimized and received subsidies from the Arab League for its activities.

In the late 1980s, General Michel Aoun was appointed President of the Council of Ministers by President Amine Gemayel, a controversial move since Aoun was a Maronite Christian and the post was by unwritten convention reserved for a Sunni Muslim. Muslim ministers refused to serve in Aoun's government, which was not recognized by Syria. Two rival administrations were formed: a military one under Aoun in East Beirut and a civilian one under Selim el-Hoss based in West Beirut; the latter gained the support of the Syrians. Aoun opposed the Syrian presence in Lebanon, citing the 1982 UN Security Council Resolution 520. Defending Syrian military presence by portraying Lebanon as an integral part of the Syrian nation and denying allegations of Soviet support, Hafez al-Assad stated to The New York Times in 1983: “Lebanon and Syria are one single people, one single nation. We may be divided into two independent states, but that does not mean that we are two different nations... I would even argue that the feeling of kinship between Syria and Lebanon runs deeper than it does between states in the United States... Soviet Union is not in Lebanon and never was present there, neither before nor after the Israeli invasion. If the aim is to do away with the Syrian presence in Lebanon, Syria, as I told you, has been at home in Lebanon for centuries. Eight years ago, we answered the call of the President of the Lebanese republic and the heart-rending call of the Lebanese people.”

The Syrian military remained in Lebanon; after a successful campaign against the Lebanese Forces militia who had controlled Beirut port, Aoun, now with massive popular support in his East Beirut enclave, declared a "War of Liberation" against the Syrian forces.

Attacking Lebanese Army that was led by Michel Aoun began on 14 March 1989. Casualties among civilians on both sides from indiscriminate artillery bombardments across the front line were numerous. Aoun initially received a greater degree of international support than el-Hoss, but this ended abruptly with the American build-up for war with Iraq over Kuwait. Aoun had received considerable support from the Iraqi government, anxious to weaken the rival Baathist government in Damascus; in October 1990 the Syrian forces attacked and occupied the Presidential Palace at Baabda.

Aoun took refuge in the French embassy and was later exiled from Lebanon to France. Circumstances surrounding his exile are controversial; his apprehension and exile are variously attributed to Syrian forces, Israel Defense Forces, Shiite militias, and the Lebanese Forces militia of Samir Geagea.

Since then, Syrian forces remained in Lebanon, exercising considerable influence. In 1991, a Treaty of "Brotherhood, Cooperation, and Coordination", signed between Lebanon and Syria, legitimized the Syrian military presence in Lebanon. It stipulated that Lebanon would not be made a threat to Syria's security and that Syria was responsible for protecting Lebanon from external threats. In September that same year a Defense and Security Pact was enacted between the two countries.

After the Israeli withdrawal from southern Lebanon and the death of Hafez al-Assad in 2000, the Syrian military presence faced criticism and resistance from the Lebanese population.

With the consequent adoption of UN Security Council Resolution 1559 and following the assassination of the Lebanese ex-premier Rafik Hariri and allegations of Syrian involvement in his death, a public uprising nicknamed the Cedar Revolution swept the country. On 5 March 2005, Syrian President Bashar Al-Assad announced that Syrian forces would begin its withdrawal from Lebanon in his address to the Syrian parliament. Syria completed its full withdrawal from Lebanon on 30 April 2005.

Foreign interference 

The Syrian occupation is a proxy war because of two reasons, the first one by reason of the number and purposes of the militias that participated. Major militias were organized along Maronite, Druze, Shi'a and Sunni identities. Militias were organized rather on political identities than confessional ones. This caused that the same confessional groups could battle each other. Amal and Hezbollah, even though both are Shi'a militias, fought brutal fights for control of the community.

Second, in the conflict, diverse foreign powers were involved as well as the militias they backed. Just about every major militia in Lebanon established a proxy relationship with a foreign state. Both Lebanon's neighbours, Syria and Israel, were among the top donors and sponsored militias from the beginning to the end of the conflict. After a few years, following the Israeli invasion of Lebanon in 1982 and a change in the dynamics of the Iran-Iraq war, Iran became actively committed in the conflict. Libya, Iraq and to a lesser extent, the United States and the Soviet Union, supplied backing to various militias. In the first half of the Lebanese Civil War, the PLO, Palestine Liberation Organization, was both a proxy and a benefactor, which was unusual in proxy warfare history.

Iran 
Iran, starting from 1982, began influencing events in Lebanon. Iran, which experienced the Islamic Revolution in 1979, is linked with Syria, primarily due to mutual anti-Iraqi sentiment. Iran wants to build a presence in Lebanon, which would allow it to share a common border with Israel and land fertile ground for extreme Islamic doctrine. Moreover, Iran discovered a long-ignored Shiite community enraged by Lebanon's establishment and hostile to Israel. Israel and Hezbollah have been fighting a low-intensity guerrilla war since 1985.

United States of America

Soviet Union

Assassinations

Kamal Jumblatt
On 16 March 1977, Kamal Jumblatt was gunned down in his car near the village of Baakline in the Chouf mountains by unidentified gunmen. His bodyguard and driver also died in the attack.

Prime suspects include the pro-Syrian faction of the Lebanese Syrian Social Nationalist Party (SSNP), in collaboration with the Ba'ath Party. In June 2005, former secretary general of the Lebanese Communist Party George Hawi claimed in an interview with Al Jazeera, that Rifaat al-Assad, brother of Hafez al Assad and uncle of Syria's current President Bashar al-Assad, had been behind the killing of Jumblatt.

Bachir Gemayel
On 14 September 1982, the Lebanese president Bachir Gemayel was addressing a speech in Achrafieh, at 4:10 PM, a bomb was detonated at the headquarters, killing him and 26 other politicians.

Habib Shartouni, a member of the Syrian Social Nationalist Party, was later arrested for the assassination. He was imprisoned for 8 years, until Syrian troops took over Lebanon at the end of the war and freed him on 13 October 1990. Eventually, then-president Amine Gemayel, the brother of Bachir, did not condemn Shartouni because of immense Syrian pressure.

Units involved

Between 1976 and 2005, Syria had on average between 20,000 and 40,000 troops in Lebanon. The major formations deployed in Lebanon were the 47th Armoured Brigade, 62nd Armoured Brigade, most of the 10th Mechanized Division (2 armored brigades - the 76th and the 91st, 1 mechanized infantry brigade, 1 artillery brigade), plus 5 Special Forces regiments deployed in strategic and tactical locations, and at least 1 Air Defense Brigade. Before 1984, a brigade of the Defense Companies was also deployed in Beirut, Sidon and Tripoli to fight Sunni militias and train pro-Syrian militias. Officers of the Military Intelligence, General Security Directorate, and Air Force intelligence were tasked with Syria's administration in Lebanon. Ghazi Kanaan and Rustum Ghazaleh were the two intelligence officers who controlled Lebanon throughout this period.

Diplomatic exchange
In October 2008, both Syria and Lebanon decided to have diplomatic relationships by establishing embassies for the first time in history since both countries gained their national independence during the 1940s. Two months later, the Syrian Embassy was opened in Beirut. In March 2009, Lebanon followed and opened its embassy in Damascus.

Special Tribunal for Lebanon

The Special Tribunal for Lebanon was formed in the wake of the assassination of former Prime Minister Rafic Hariri on 14 February 2005. Following which the Syrian military presence ended on 26 April 2005 after the Cedar Revolution that took place as a reaction to the assassination.

In 2010, as rumors abounded of an indictment to members of Hezbollah and rising tensions, Syrian President Bashar al-Assad visited Lebanon for the first time since the Hariri's assassination along with Saudi King Abdullah.

Political status 
Analyzing whether and when the Syrian presence was a military occupation under international law, Gerhard von Glahn writes that "The mandate of the Force was renewed several times before it officially expired on 27 July 1982, at the time of the Israeli siege of Beirut. The Lebanese government refused to request that the mandate be renewed by the Arab League. Instead, in September 1986, Lebanon requested an end to the Syrian presence in Lebanon. It would appear that lacking legal authority from both Lebanon and the Arab League, Syria's military forces had to be regarded henceforth as illegal occupants of Lebanon."

Comparing Syrian occupation of Lebanon with the Soviet occupations of Eastern Europe, Professor of Middle East Studies Mordechai Nisan writes:"Throughout the modern history of the Arab world, Nasser oppressed his Egyptian people, Saddam Hussein his Iraqi people, and Muammar Qaddafi his Libyan people. But Hafez el-Assad oppressed not only his Syrian people but the Lebanese people as well. Dictatorship was not an uncommon regime form, but a successful and long-term conquest was unusual. Egypt fought in Yemen (1963–67) and Iraq invaded Kuwait (1990), but only Syria occupied a fellow Arab country for thirty years... Stalinism in Eastern Europe and Assadism in Lebanon offer certain similarities for consideration. Military invasion, political manipulation, and ideological co-optation supplied the means for the Soviet Union to penetrate and dominate Eastern Europe; these were also methods employed by Syria against Lebanon. The common goal was the homogenization of thought and culture under centralized rule."

See also
Israeli occupation of Southern Lebanon
Palestinian insurgency in South Lebanon
Lebanon bombings and assassinations (2004–present)
List of assassinated Lebanese people

Notes

Bibliography

External links
The Syrian Occupation of Lebanon
The Syrian Occupation of Lebanon
Pining for Freedom: Syrian occupation suffocates Lebanon, and the world shrugs
Ending Syria's Occupation of Lebanon: The U.S. Role
Forecast of the Lebanese economy in the post-Syrian occupation era
"SYRIA/LEBANON: The Occupied/Occupied", PBS FRONTLINE/World

1976 in Lebanon
1976 establishments in Lebanon
2005 disestablishments in Lebanon
1970s in Lebanon
1980s in Lebanon
1990s in Lebanon
2000s in Lebanon
20th century in Lebanon
Lebanese Civil War
Lebanon–Syria relations
Military occupation
Military history of Syria